The 2016 Denver Stampede season was the first and only season in the club's history. Coached by Sean O'Leary and captained by Pedrie Wannenburg, Denver competed in the United States' 2016 PRO Rugby competition which they won.

Jersey and sponsors
In 2016 Denver jerseys were made by Champion System.

Fixtures

All home matches were played at Infinity Park in Denver through May and then at the University of Denver's CIBER Field.

Ladder

Ladder progression

Squad

Staff
 Head coach: Sean O'Leary 
 Assistant coach: Peter Borlase
 Assistant coach: David Williams
 Technical advisor: André Snyman

Transfers

References

Den
2016 in sports in Colorado
Sports in Colorado